Fabrizio Mioni (September 23, 1930 – 8 June 2020) was an Italian actor. He appeared in the films Roland the Mighty, Hercules, The Blue Angel, Get Yourself a College Girl, Girl Happy, The Venetian Affair, The Secret War of Harry Frigg and The Pink Jungle. He appeared in the television series Goodyear Theatre, The Lineup, Bronco, Bourbon Street Beat, Alcoa Presents: One Step Beyond, Markham, General Electric Theater, Death Valley Days, 77 Sunset Strip, The Lloyd Bridges Show, Breaking Point, Dr. Kildare, Bonanza, Perry Mason, The Man from U.N.C.L.E., The Virginian, The Long, Hot Summer, Occasional Wife, I Spy, The Girl from U.N.C.L.E., The Big Valley, Garrison's Gorillas, The Rat Patrol, The High Chaparral, To Rome with Love and Love, American Style.

Filmography

References

External links
 

1930 births
2020 deaths
20th-century Italian male actors
Italian male film actors